The Mosque of Divinity built 1997, is a mosque located in Ouakam, Senegal. It is a structure with two minarets. The mosque provides a view of the Atlantic Ocean, as the mosque lies near the shore, at the Corniche-Ouest.

History 
The original idea to build the mosque first came from Mohamed Gorgui Seyni Guèye. He came up with the idea in 1973. However, the actual building was built by Cheikh Ngom, and wasn't completed until 1997. No money was paid to anybody during construction.

Architecture 
The minaret of the mosque stands at a height of 45 meters.

See also 
 Islam in Senegal

References 

Buildings and structures in Dakar
Mosques in Senegal